Amaltheus is an oxyconic ammonite with a fairly open umbilicus, serrated keel,  and slightly sigmoidal ribs from the Lower Jurassic, many of which are strigate. Amaltheus, named by de Montfort, 1808, is indicative of the upper Pliensbachian stage in Europe, north Africa, Caucasus, Siberia, N. Alaska, Canada, Oregon, and possibly Honduras; and is the type for the Amaltheidae and a member of the Eoderoceratoidea.

Two subgenera are recognized. One, A.(Amaltheus) is already described. The other A. (Pseudoamaltheus), sometimes expressed as genus, is a late derivative of (Amaltheus) with an early loss of keel and ribbing and an extreme development of strigation.

References
Notes

Bibliography
 Arkell et al., 1957. Mesozoic Ammonoidea. Treatise in Invertebrate Paleontology, Part L; Geological Society of America and University Kansas press.
 Donovan, Collomon,& Howarth. Classification of the Jurassic Ammonitina, in The Ammonoidea, M.R. House and J.R. Senior (eds)  Academic Press 1981.  Systematics Association Special Volume. 18. 

Ammonitida genera
Eoderoceratoidea
Jurassic ammonites
Early Jurassic ammonites of Europe
Fossil taxa described in 1808